Mittonia hampsoni is a species of snout moth in the genus Mittonia. It was described by William Lucas Distant in 1897 and is known from South Africa (including Transvaal) and Zambia.

References

Moths described in 1897
Pyralinae